Stephen Adamson is an Irish international lawn and indoor bowler.

Bowls career
He won a silver medal in the pairs at the 1992 World Outdoor Bowls Championship in Worthing.

He also won a bronze medal in pairs at the 1994 Commonwealth Games in Victoria, British Columbia.

In addition to his international success he also won the 1990 Irish National Bowls Championships singles.

References

Male lawn bowls players from Northern Ireland
Living people
Commonwealth Games medallists in lawn bowls
Commonwealth Games bronze medallists for Northern Ireland
Year of birth missing (living people)
Bowls players at the 1994 Commonwealth Games
Medallists at the 1994 Commonwealth Games